Northern Areas Transport Corporation or NATCO is the largest transport company in Gilgit-Baltistan of Pakistan and Karakoram Highway, throughout the Northern Areas. Natco is providing its service from Rawalpindi to Karachi daily for last decade. It is connecting all Pakistan.

The company works under Ministry of Kashmir Affairs & Gilgit Baltistan.

NATCO offers passenger road service between Islamabad, Gilgit and Sost (near the Chinese border). There is passenger road service between Tashkurgan and the Pakistani cities of Sust and Gilgit. Road service between Kashgar and Gilgit (via Tashkurgan and Sust) started in summer 2006. However, the border crossing between China and Pakistan at Khunjerab Pass (the highest border in the world) is open only between May 1 and December 31 as the roads are blocked by snow during winter.
You can find Information of routes and Fares in Official site.
NATCO Bus Services always closed on Eid vacations (for three days).

On 30 November 2006 NATCO started a non-stop express bus service from Islamabad to Gilgit.

on 20 April 2015 Natco Celebrated its 41st anniversary at Head Office Gilgit.

See also
Karakoram Highway
Gilgit
Gilgit-Baltistan
Karakoram

References

Sources
PIA Northern Areas Page
NATCO Northern Area Transport Corporation 

Bus companies of Pakistan
Transport in Gilgit-Baltistan
Government-owned companies of Pakistan
Pakistan federal departments and agencies
Transport companies established in 1974
Pakistani companies established in 1974